Barnet is the primary village and a census-designated place (CDP) in the town of Barnet, Caledonia County, Vermont, United States. As of the 2020 census, the CDP had a population of 127, out of 1,663 in the entire town of Barnet.

The village is in southeastern Caledonia County, along the southeast edge of the town of Barnet, sitting on the west bank of the Connecticut River. It is bordered to the southeast, across the river, by the town of Monroe, New Hampshire.

Interstate 91 forms the northwest edge of the CDP, with access from Exit 18 (West Barnet Road). I-91 leads north  to St. Johnsbury and south  to White River Junction. U.S. Route 5 passes through the center of the village, paralleling I-91; it leads north  to St. Johnsbury and south  to Wells River.

References 

Populated places in Caledonia County, Vermont
Census-designated places in Caledonia County, Vermont
Census-designated places in Vermont